I Was an Adventuress (French: J'étais une aventurière) is a 1938 French comedy drama film directed by Raymond Bernard and starring Edwige Feuillère, Jean Murat and Jean-Max. It was remade in 1940 as an American film of the same title. It was part of a growing trend of English-language remakes of major French films.

The film's sets were designed by the art directors Léon Barsacq and Jean Perrier.

Main cast
 Edwige Feuillère as Véra Vronsky 
 Jean Murat as Pierre Glorin 
 Jean-Max as Désormeaux 
 Guillaume de Sax as Le marquis Koréani 
 Félix Oudart as Rutherford 
 Milly Mathis as Une paysanne 
 André Numès Fils as Le cousin Édouard
 Christian Argentin as Van Kongen 
 Mona Goya as Une jeune femme 
 Louis Vonelly as Texter 
 Jean Tissier as Paulo 
 Marguerite Moreno as Tante Émilie

References

Bibliography 
 Crisp, Colin. Genre, Myth and Convention in the French Cinema, 1929-1939. Indiana University Press, 2002.

External links 
 

1938 films
French comedy-drama films
1938 comedy-drama films
1930s French-language films
Films directed by Raymond Bernard
French black-and-white films
1930s French films